An acrobat is one who practises acrobatics.

Acrobat may also refer to:

Computers
 Adobe Acrobat, a family of computer programs
 Acrobat.com, a suite of hosted document exchange services from Adobe Systems

Music
 "Acrobat" (U2 song), from U2's album Achtung Baby
 "Acrobat", a song from Maxïmo Park's album A Certain Trigger
"Acrobat" (Jo Gwang-il song), from Jo Gwang-il's album Dark Adaptation
 Acrobat Records, an American independent record company

Film
The Acrobat, a 1941 French comedy
The Acrobat (2019 film), a 2019 Canadian drama

Other uses
Paraavis Acrobat, a Russian paraglider design
 Acrobats (1927), a sculpture by Alan Durst